There are many higher education associations, organizations, and alliances in the United States of America. These groups are relevant to the structure of higher education in the United States. One way the associations distinguish themselves is if their members are presidents of institutions or not.

Presidential Associations (informally known as The Six)

American Council on Education (ACE) 

Established in 1918, the American Council on Education (ACE)  is a United States organization comprising over 1,800 accredited, degree-granting colleges and universities and higher education-related associations, organizations, and corporations.

ACE is being known as the "umbrella" higher education association in the United States. Based in Washington, D.C. at the National Center for Higher Education, ACE convenes the "Group of The Six" which brings together the six most important presidentially based higher education associations in the United States, in order to foster collaboration, to monitor and influence federal policy and to collaborate on issues of common interest.

The associations belonging to the "Group of The Six" are: ACE, AACC, APLU, AASCU, AAU and NAICU.

Activities 
The organization conducts public policy advocacy, research, and other initiatives related to key higher education issues, and plays a significant role in higher education leadership development.

It has different programs, including "International Initiatives", "Diversity", "Public Policy" "ACE Fellow Programs" among others.

Leadership 
President: Ted Mitchell

American Association of Community Colleges (AACC) 

Founded in 1920, the American Association of Community Colleges (AACC), headquartered in the National Center for Higher Education in Washington, D.C., is the primary advocacy organization for community colleges at the national level and works closely with directors of state offices to inform and affect state policy.

AACC is member of "The Group of The Six"

The association has ongoing interaction with key federal departments and agencies including the U.S. departments of Labor, Education, Energy, Homeland Security, and Commerce and the National Science Foundation.

AACC represents almost 1,200 community colleges from the U.S. in which there are enrolled more than 11 million students.

Leadership 
President: Walter G. Bumphus, Ph.D.

American Association of State Colleges and Universities (AASCU) 

Founded in 1951, the American Association of State Colleges and Universities (AASCU) is an organization of state-supported colleges and universities that offer degree programs leading to bachelor's, master's or doctoral degrees. AASCU grew out of the Association of Teacher Education Institutions that had been organized in 1951 to serve public comprehensive institutions most of them having begun as single purpose institutions, most of them normal schools.

Members of AASCU work to extend higher education to all citizens, including those who have been traditionally underrepresented on college campuses.  By Delivering America’s Promise, these institutions fulfill the expectations of a public university by working for the public good through education and engagement, thereby improving the lives of people in their community, their region and their state.  The American Association of State Colleges and Universities represents more than 400 public colleges, universities and systems of higher education throughout the United States and its territories.

Leadership 
President: Dr. Mildred García

Association of American Universities (AAU) 

Founded in 1900, the Association of American Universities (AAU) is an organization of 62 leading research universities devoted to maintaining a strong system of academic research and education. It consists of sixty universities in the United States (both public and private) and two universities in Canada.

The primary purpose of the AAU is to provide a forum for the development and implementation of institutional and national policies, in order to promote strong programs in academic research and scholarship and undergraduate, graduate, and professional education.  AAU is headquartered in Washington, D.C.

Leadership 
President: Barbara R. Snyder

Association of Public and Land-grant Universities (APLU) 

Founded in 1886, the Association of Public and Land-grant Universities (APLU) is a non-profit association of 218 public research universities, land-grant institutions, and state university systems with member campuses in all 50 states, U.S. territories and the District of Columbia.

The APLU membership includes 76 land-grant institutions, of which 18 are the historically black institutions and the interests of the nation’s 33 American Indian land-grant colleges through the membership of the American Indian Higher Education Consortium (AIHEC). APLU institutions enroll more than 3.5 million undergraduate students and 1.1 million graduate students, employ more than 645,000 faculty members, and conduct nearly two-thirds of all federally funded academic research, totaling more than $34 billion annually.

Leadership 
President: M. Peter McPherson

National Association of Independent Colleges and Universities (NAICU) 

Founded in 1976, the National Association of Independent Colleges and Universities (NAICU) is an organization of private US colleges and universities. NAICU has over 1,000 independent higher education institutions.

Leadership 
President: Barbara K. Mistick

Other Higher Education Associations

American Educational Research Association (AERA) 

Founded in 1916, American Educational Research Association (AERA) is a professional organization representing educational researchers in the United States and around the world. Headquartered in Washington, D.C., AERA strives to advance knowledge about education and promote the use of research to improve education and the public good.

Activities 
In addition to publishing six education research journals, AERA is involved in education policy initiatives, professional development, and its annual meeting attended by over 12,000 members of the global education research community.

Leadership 
President: Joyce E. King

Association of American Colleges and Universities (AAC&U) 

Founded in 1915, the Association of American Colleges and Universities (AAC&U) is a non-profit association of nearly 1,300 member institutions, including accredited public and private colleges, community colleges, research universities, and comprehensive universities of every type and size.

AAC&U is a leading national association concerned with the quality, vitality, and public standing of undergraduate liberal-arts education. AAC&U works to reinforce the commitment to liberal education at both the national and the local level and to help individual colleges and universities keep the quality of student learning at the core of their work as they evolve to meet new economic and social challenges.

Leadership 
President: Carol Geary Schneider

Association of Governing Boards of Universities and Colleges (AGB) 

Founded in 1921, the Association of Governing Boards of Universities and Colleges (AGB) is a non-profit association of more than 1,250 member institutions: colleges and universities of all types (independent and public, four-year and two-year, and general and specialized) plus public college and university foundation boards.

AGB is a national association that serves the interests and needs of academic governing boards, boards of institutionally related foundations, and campus CEOs and other senior-level campus administrators on issues related to higher education governance and leadership.

Leadership 
President: Richard Legon

University Professional and Continuing Education Association (UPCEA) 

Founded in 1915, University Professional and Continuing Education Association (UPCEA) is a higher education association non-profit which focuses on professional, continuing, and online higher education. UPCEA serves more than 400 institutions, including most of the leading public and private colleges and universities in North America. For over 100 years, the association has served its members with conferences and specialty seminars, research and bench marking information, professional networking opportunities and timely publications. The major organizational structure defers to the Networks, or communities of practice, and Regions, location-based groups. Based in Washington, D.C., UPCEA also builds greater awareness of the vital link between contemporary learners and public policy issues.

Leadership 
CEO: Robert Hansen

Association of Departments of English 

ADE was founded in 1965.

References